Niad may refer to:

 an alternative spelling of Naiad (disambiguation)
 NIAD Art Center, a U.S. nonprofit arts organization
 NIAD-QE, originally called NIAD, National Institution for Academic Degrees and Quality Enhancement of Higher Education, Japan